On 7 August 2013, eleven teenagers were killed and twenty-six others were injured while playing football at a market in Karachi, Pakistan. The bombing took place in the Lyari District of Karachi. The bomb was targeted at provincial leader Javed Nagori, who was attending the match handing out prizes.

See also

 Terrorist incidents in Pakistan in 2013

References

2013 murders in Pakistan
21st-century mass murder in Pakistan
Terrorist incidents in Pakistan in 2013
Improvised explosive device bombings in Pakistan
Mass murder in 2013
Murdered Pakistani children
2010s in Karachi
Marketplace attacks in Asia
Terrorist incidents in Karachi
August 2013 events in Pakistan